Punjab Assembly Committee on Petitions of Punjab Legislative Assembly is constituted annually for a one year period from among the members of the Assembly. This Committee consists of thirteen members.

Appointment 
The speaker appoints the committee and its members every year for a one year term according to the powers conferred by Article 208 of the Constitution of India read with section 32 of the States Reorganisation Act, 1956 (37 of 1956), and in pursuance of Rules 232(1) and 2(b) of the Rules of Procedure and Conduct of Business in the Punjab Legislative Assembly.

Members
For the one year period starting May 2022, the Committee on Petitions of 16th Punjab Assembly had following members:

Chairpersons

Previous members
For the one year period in the 15th Punjab Assembly the committee had following members:

2021-2022

2019-2020

2018-2019

2017-2018

References 

Committees of the Punjab Legislative Assembly